Lauro Del Corona, better known by his stage name Lauro Corona (Rio de Janeiro, 6 July 1957 — Rio de Janeiro, 20 July 1989) was a Brazilian actor.

Television 
1988: Vida Nova as Manuel Victor 	
1987: Direito de Amar as Adriano Monserrat 	
 	
1984: Corpo a Corpo as Rafa da Motta
1984: Vereda Tropical as Victor de Oliva Salgado 
 	
1983: Louco Amor as Lipe Dumont 
 	
1982: Elas por Elas as Gil Aranha Muniz  	
1981: Baila Comigo as Caê Maia
  	
1979: Os Gigantes as Polaco	
1978: Dancin' Days as Beto Souza Prado Cardoso

References

External links
 

1957 births
1989 deaths
Male actors from Rio de Janeiro (city)
Brazilian LGBT actors
AIDS-related deaths in Rio de Janeiro (state)